La Citadelle (in Arabic El Kalaa) is a 1988 Algerian film written and directed by Mohamed Chouikh. A tragi-comedy set against the background of sexual inequality, it traces the amorous adventures of the young Kaddour, whose arranged marriage is intended as a lesson taught to him by his elders. Starring Djilali Ain-Tedeles, it won the prize for Best Cinematography (Allel Yahyaoui) at the 11th FESPACO held at Ouagadougou in 1989.

Technical details
 Director - Mohamed Chouikh
 Writer - Mohamed Chouikh
 Producer - Mohamed Tahar Harhoura
 Director of Photography - Allel Yahyaoui
 Running Time - 96 mins
 Country - Algeria
 Language - Arabic
 Release Date - 1988

Cast
 Djilali Ain-Tedeles
 Khaled Barkat
 Fatima Belhadj
 Momo

1988 films
Algerian drama films